Jenewein is a surname. Notable people with the surname include:

Dagmar Belakowitsch-Jenewein (born 1968), Austrian politician
Felix Jenewein (1857–1905), Czech painter, illustrator and lithographer
Hans-Jörg Jenewein (born 1974), Austrian politician

See also 
Jennewein